Viggiù (  ) is a comune (municipality) in the Province of Varese in the Italian region Lombardy, located about  northwest of Milan and about  northeast of Varese, on the border with Switzerland.

Viggiù borders the following municipalities: Arcisate, Besano, Bisuschio, Cantello, Clivio, Meride (Switzerland), Saltrio.

Main sights 
The church of Santo Stefano,   in Romanesque style, was erected at the limit of a crown of houses, which constituted a large and high amphitheater facing the Valceresio area. The church was enlarged in the 15th century to reach its current size, three wide aisles, divided into four bays, separated by six columns and surmounted by capitals.

People
Gianni Danzi (1940–2007), Roman Catholic Archbishop of the Territorial Prelature of Loreto
Sandy Cane, (1961 - ), the first black mayor of Italy elected in June 2009.

Twin towns
 Barre, USA
 San Fratello, Italy

References

External links
 Official website 
 www.viggiu-in-rete.org
 www.scris.it

Cities and towns in Lombardy